Khvosh Makan (also Romanized as Khvosh Makān and Khowsh Makān) is a village in Howmeh Rural District, in the Central District of Dashtestan County, Bushehr Province, Iran. At the 2006 census, its population was 1,117, in 245 families.

References 

Populated places in Dashtestan County